The  is Japan's largest ultra-conservative and ultranationalist far-right non-governmental organization and lobby group. It was established in 1997 and has approximately 38,000 to 40,000 members as of 2020. The group influences the legislative and executive branches of the Japanese government through its affiliates. Former prime minister Shinzo Abe, an LDP politician, served as a special advisor to the group's parliamentary league. The group's membership includes grassroots activists as well as national and local politicians; with most of its active members being retired men over 60 years of age as the organization has faced difficulty attracting young people.

The number of National Diet members associated with the group's parliamentary league was 252 in 2013, peaking at 289 in 2014. As of 2022 the number stands at 206, out of 710 Diet seats. 

The organization describes its aims as to "change the postwar national consciousness based on the Tokyo Tribunal's view of history as a fundamental problem" and to revise Japan's current Constitution, especially Article 9 which forbids the maintenance of a standing army. The group also aims to promote patriotic education, support official visits to Yasukuni Shrine, and promote a nationalist interpretation of State Shinto.

In the words of Hideaki Kase, an influential member of Nippon Kaigi, "We are dedicated to our conservative cause. We are monarchists. We are for revising the constitution. We are for the glory of the nation."

Objectives
Nippon Kaigi has described six official goals of the organization as:
 "A beautiful traditional sovereignty for Japan's future": Fostering a sense of Japanese unity and social stability, based around the Imperial Household and shared history, culture, and traditions of the Japanese people.
 "A new constitution appropriate for the new era": Restoring national defense rights, rectifying the imbalance of rights and obligations, strengthening the emphasis on the family system, and loosening the separation of religion and state.
 "Politics that protect the state's reputation and the people's lives": Addressing the loss of public interest in politics and government by taking a more aggressive stance in historical debates and crisis management.
 "Creating education that fosters a sense of Japanese identity": Addressing various problems arising in the Japanese educational system (bullying, prostitution, etc.) and instituting respect for the national flag and anthem of Japan, and for national history, culture, and traditions.
 "Contributing to world peace by strengthening national security": Strengthening Japanese defense power in order to counterbalance China, North Korea, Russia, and other hostile powers, and remembering Japan's war dead.
 "Friendship with the world tied together by a spirit of co-existence and mutual prosperity": Building friendly relations with foreign countries through social and cultural exchange programs.

Nippon Kaigi believes that "Japan should be applauded for liberating much of East Asia from Western colonial powers; that the 1946–1948 Tokyo War Crimes tribunals were illegitimate; and that killings by Imperial Japanese troops during the 1937 Nanjing Massacre were exaggerated or fabricated". The group vigorously defends Japan's claim in its territorial dispute over the Senkaku Islands with China, and denies that Japan forced the "comfort women" during World War II. Nippon Kaigi is opposed to feminism, LGBT rights, and the 1999 Gender Equality Law.

History
Nippon Kaigi was founded in 1997 through the merger of two groups whose agendas included constitutional revision:
Nihon wo mamoru Kokumin Kaigi (National Conference to Defend [or Protect] Japan, founded in 1981) included many veterans of Japan's Imperial Army and Navy, and published its own Constitutional reform draft in 1994. Its predecessor was Gengo Houseika Jitsugen Kokumin Kaigi (National Conference to Implement Regnal Year Legislation, founded in 1978).
Nihon wo mamoru Kai (Society for the Protection of Japan, founded in 1974), that comprised several Shinto and religious cults.

The founding President was Koichi Tsukamoto, the founder of Japanese clothier Wacoal. Yuzo Kabashima, the secretary general of Nippon Kaigi, established a sister organization Nihon Seinen Kyogikai in 1977, which is headquartered in the same building as Nippon Kaigi and acts as the organization's secretariat.

The organisation saw remarkably swift success in establishing strong connections among the establishment and in passing legislation that was congruent with the group's aims. In 1999, the Diet at last formally recognised Kimigayo as Japan's national anthem and the Hi no Maru as Japan's national flag. After the legislation passed, ensuing years saw the Ministry of Education and prefectural educational committees such as those of Tokyo governor Shintaro Ishihara issue guidelines forcing school teachers to adhere to specific procedures concerning these national symbols in the educational context.

Organisation and membership

Nippon Kaigi claims 40,000 individual members, 47 prefectural chapters, and about 230 local chapters.  The organization's website lists the members depending on their seniority in the organization headed by a President seconded by Vice Presidents and a pool of "advisors", including Shinto priests leading key shrines, some of them belonging to the Imperial family.

Following the 2014 reshuffle, 15 of the 18 of Third Abe Cabinet members, including the Prime Minister himself (as 'special adviser'), were members of Nippon Kaigi. As of October 2014, the group claimed 289 of the 480 Japanese National Diet members. Among the members, former members, and affiliated are countless lawmakers, many ministers and a few prime ministers including Tarō Asō, Shinzō Abe, and Yoshihide Suga. Abe's brother Nobuo Kishi is also a member of the Nippon Kaigi group in the Diet. Its former chairman, Toru Miyoshi, was the former Chief Justice of the Supreme Court of Japan.

After campaigning actively for LDP candidates in July 2016, Nippon Kaigi campaigned for constitutional revisionism in September 2016.

Presidency

Criticism

Journalist Norimitsu Onishi says that the organization promotes a revival of the values of the Empire of Japan; Tamotsu Sugano, the author of the bestselling exposé on the group, Research on Nippon Kaigi describes them as a movement democratic in method but intent on turning back sexual equality, restoring patriarchal values, and returning Japan to a pre-war constitution that is neither democratic nor modern. On 6 January 2017, sale of the book was banned by a district court for defamation pending removal of the offending portion; a revised digital edition continued to be sold.  Sales resumed that March when the court allowed a revised edition with 36 characters deleted to appear.

Muneo Narusawa, the editor of Shūkan Kin'yōbi (Weekly Friday) says that, in parallel with historical revisionism, the organization often highlights historical facts that convey Japan as a victim such as with the atomic bombings of Hiroshima and Nagasaki, when the Soviets declared war and invaded Manchuria or the North Korean abductions of Japanese citizens. Former education minister Hakubun Shimomura, the secretary general of the Discussion Group of Nippon Kaigi Diet Members (Nippon Kaigi kokkai giin kondankai), argues for patriotic education and opposes a "masochistic view of history".

The Hankyoreh, a centre-left/liberal newspaper in South Korea, denounced right-wing nationalism led by Shinzo Abe and Nippon Kaigi as "anti-Korean nationalism" in its English column. Jacobin, an American left-wing magazine, said the LDP and Nippon Kaigi carry the legacy of Japanese fascism. The National Review, an American conservative magazine, also described them and then some LDP politicians as fascism.

See also
Anti-Korean sentiment in Japan
Historical negationism
Historical revisionism
Japanese nationalism
Japanese Society for History Textbook Reform
Seicho-no-Ie (fundamental movement sect)
New Right (South Korea)
Propaganda Due

Notes

References
 Shibuichi Daiki; "Japan Conference (Nippon Kaigi): an Elusive Conglomerate"; East Asia, Vol. 34 (2017), Nr. 3, S. 1–18
 Tawara Yoshifumi; "What is the Aim of Nippon Kaigi, the Ultra-Right Organization that Supports Japan’s Abe Administration?"; Japan Focus, Volume 15 (2017), Issue 21,  Number 1 (Volltext)
 Tawara Yoshifumi; 日本会議の全貌: 知られざる巨大組織の実態 [Outlook of Nippon Kaigi: Actual Situation of Unknown Big Organization]; T. 2016 (Kadensha); 
 Yamaguchi Tomomi; in: Shūkan Kin'yōbi, Narusawa Mueno ed., 日本会議と神社本庁[Nippon Kaigi and Association of Shinto Shrines]Tokyo 2016 (Kin'yōbi);

External links
 日本会議 (Japan Conference) 
 United States Congressional Transcript in response to Nippon Kaigi 
 Tawara Yoshifumi: What is the Aim of Nippon Kaigi, the Ultra-Right Organization that Supports Japan’s Abe Administration? Asia-Pacific Journal / Japan Focus, 1 November 2017.

 
1997 establishments in Japan
Anti-Korean sentiment in Japan
Conservatism in Japan
Empire of Japan
Far-right politics in Japan
Fascism in Japan
Historical negationism
Historical revisionism of Comfort women
Identity politics in Japan
Japanese imperialism and colonialism
Japanese nationalism
Japanese militarism
Monarchist organizations in Japan
Monarchist organizations
Nanjing Massacre deniers
National conservatism
Neocolonialism
Opposition to feminism
Organizations that oppose LGBT rights
Politics of Japan
Reactionary
Religious nationalism
Shinzo Abe
State Shinto